The Anthrax mite (Sarcoptes anthracis) is a pathogenic mite and an intermediate host of anthrax.

Sarcoptes anthracis was classified by Dmitri Ivanovsky in 1901 after first occurrences of infection on Asian Tufted Deers. The parasitic itch mite burrows into skin and causes sarcoptic mange, mostly seen on even-toed ungulates. Pregnant female mites tunnel into the stratum corneum of a host's skin and deposit eggs in the burrows. Young mites move about on the skin and molt into a "nymphal" stage, hosting Bacillus anthracis in their digestive tract. They act as a vector that carries and transmits anthrax to their hosts causing an infection, which often results in death because the immune system was weakened by scabies before. The high host specificity of the mites is held responsible for the fact that mostly even-toed ungulates struggled with these consequences. In late 1950s the last foci of infection were reported in semi-domesticated reindeers after which no greater incidences were observed.

References
 Madigan M.; Martinko J.: "Brock Biology of Microorganisms" (9th ed.). Prentice Hall. pp. 233–35. 

Sarcoptiformes
Zoonoses